This is the list of winners of the Sundance Film Festival Audience Award for documentary features.

1980s 
1989: For All Mankind

1990s 
1990: Berkeley in the Sixties
1991: American Dream
1992: Brother's Keeper 
1993: Something Within Me
1994: Hoop Dreams
1995: Ballot Measure 9/Unzipped
1996: Troublesome Creek: A Midwestern
1997: Hurricane Streets
1998: Out of the Past
1999: Genghis Blues

2000s 
2000: No award
2001: No award
2002: Amandla!: A Revolution in Four-Part Harmony
2003: My Flesh and Blood
2004: Born into Brothels
2005: Murderball
2006: God Grew Tired of Us
2007: Hear and Now
2008: Fuel
2009: The Cove

2010s 
2010: Waiting for "Superman"
2011: Buck
2012: The Invisible War
2013: Blood Brother
2014: Alive Inside: A Story of Music and Memory
2015: Meru
2016: Jim: The James Foley Story
2017: Chasing Coral
2018: The Sentence
2019: Knock Down the House

2020s 
2020: Crip Camp
2021: Summer of Soul
2022: Navalny

References

Awards established in 1989
Sundance Film Festival